Guestwick is a village and a civil parish in the English county of Norfolk. The village lies far from any High roads. The nearest railway station is at Sheringham for the Bittern Line which runs between Sheringham, Cromer and Norwich. The nearest airport is Norwich International Airport.

Location
There are two settlements that make up the parish of Guestwick. Guestwick Green in the south west of the parish and Guestwick which is centered on the parish church of Saint Peter. In the parish there is a scattering of farms and isolated properties. The Parish largely relies on near-by settlements of Foulsham and Reepham for its facilities. Guestwick is situated south of the North Norfolk coast which is only  or 20 minutes by car.

History
In the Domesday Book, Guestwick is mentioned but as the settlement of Geghestueit and is described as an area of pasture land used by the people of the nearby village of Guist. By the beginning of the 11th century it has been recorded that the settlement had its own church and so had become independent. The village has an Old Station House, which belonged to the former Midland and Great Northern Railway which ran from Norwich to Sheringham on the North Norfolk Coast.

Saint Peter’s Parish Church
The Parish church of Saint Peter has a Saxon-Norman tower constructed of carstone set in the angle between the chancel and the north aisle. Originally it was set in the center and the arches to its chancel and nave are still there although they are filled with masonry now. In the south aisle there are two windows with examples of 15th century Norwich Glass. The altar rails and altar table are from the Georgian period.

To the north of the church can be found the Congregational Chapel which is one of the earliest in England. It was built in 1652 but has been altered in 1809 and again in 1840. The one time minister John Godwin was the father of the political philosopher William Godwin and the grandfather of Mary Godwin who became Mary Shelley
who is best known for her Gothic novel Frankenstein; or, The Modern Prometheus (1818).

References

External links

Villages in Norfolk
Civil parishes in Norfolk
Broadland